Nesna University College ( or ) was a university college, a Norwegian state institution of higher education, until it became part of Nord University in 2016. Its campus was in the village of Nesna in Nesna Municipality. In April 2019, the university board of directors proposed a measure to close this campus by 2022 and in May 2019, the campus was closed by order of the health and safety representative effective immediately. This led to large student protests and demonstrations primarily directed against the closure, but also as a broader protest against the municipal and region mergers put into effect by the Solberg Cabinet.

History

It was established in 1918 as Nesna Teachers' College, and was reorganised as a state university college on 1 August 1994 following the university college reform. Until 2016, it was one of the 24 Norwegian state university colleges.

The university college had approximately 1200 students and 130 employees. The original teachers' college was established in 1918 by the local priest, Ivar Hjellvik, making it the second oldest institution of higher education in Northern Norway.  This university college had permanent satellite campuses in the neighboring towns of Mo i Rana and Sandnessjøen. Nesna University College hosts the Nordic Women's University.

See also
University college (Scandinavia)

References

External links
 Nesna University College (English)

 
Nesna
Universities and colleges in Norway
Education in Nordland
Educational institutions established in 1918
1918 establishments in Norway